Vasily Evgrafovich Yakovlev (also transliterated Vasiliy Ewgrafowitsch Jakovlev or Vasiliy Yevgrafovich Yakovlev; 9 February 1839 – 15 August 1908) was a Russian zoologist who studied fishes, molluscs and insects. He is not to be confused with Alexander Ivanovich Yakovlev, another entomologist. His name was spelled Wassily Ewgrafowitsch Jakowlew in French, in which he sometimes wrote.

Yakovlev lived in Saint Petersburg, but travelled extensively collecting insects in the Crimea, Volga region and Turkestan until he finally travelled and settled in Griffin, GA. Although primarily interested in Coleoptera Yakovlev also worked on Hemiptera and Lepidoptera.

From around 1867 Yakovlev conducted zoological observations in the vicinity of Astrakhan. Yakovlev described Caspian roach (Rutilus caspicus) and Volga undermouth (Chondrostoma variabile).

Publications
Partial list
Description de quelques Longicornes paléarctiques nouveaux ou peu connus. Horae Soc. Ent. Ross. 29: 506–514. (1895)
De speciebus novis generum Dorcadion Dalm. et Neodorcadion Ganglb.Annuaire Mus. Zool. St.-Pétersburg 4: 237–244 (1899).
Etude sue les Neodorcadion da l'Asie Russe (Coleoptera, Cerambycidae)Rev. Russ. d'Entom. 1 (4–5): 146–166 (1901).
 A new species of Neodorcadion Ganglb. (Coleoptera, Cerambycidae) Rev. Russ. d'Entom. 6: 1–2. (1906)
 Lepidoptera palaearctica nova descripta a Gr. Grum-Grshimailo. III 290–293 Corrigenda. Auctore G. Jacobson 294–297."Trudy Russkago entomologicheskago obshchestva. Horae
 Hemiptera of the Volga region fauna. Uchenye Zapiski Kazanskogo Universiteta, Otdelenie Fiziko-Matematicheskikh i Meditsinskikh Nauk 1[1864]:109–129 (1865).
Lucanides nouveaux ou peu connus.Horae Soc. Ent. Ross

References

 Semenov-Tian-Shanski, A. (1910) Vasily Evgrafovich Jakovlev. Horae Societatis Entomologicheskago Rossicae 39:1–57+1 portrait (in Russian)

1839 births
1908 deaths
People from Volgograd
People from Tsaritsynsky Uyezd
Biologists from the Russian Empire
Russian lepidopterists
Emigrants from the Russian Empire to France
Russian zoologists
Russian ichthyologists
19th-century scientists from the Russian Empire
20th-century Russian scientists